Diomideia is a settlement and a community in the Vistonida municipal unit of the Xanthi regional unit of Greece. According to the 2011 census, the population of Diomideia was 4,421 inhabitants.

References

Populated places in Xanthi (regional unit)